Alan Crosland Jr. (June 19, 1918 - December 18, 2001) was a prolific director and editor of film and television from the 1940s to the 1980s. Between 1954 and 1984, Crosland directed nearly 70 films and television episodes. He is best known for directing the two-part pilot of The Bionic Woman in 1976 and episodes of The Twilight Zone in 1963. He is the son of director Alan Crosland.

Filmography

Feature films

Short films

References

American film editors
Film directors from Pennsylvania